The Reese–Johnson–Virgin House is a historic Gothic Revival-style house at 193 Genoa Ln. in Genoa, Nevada.  Also known as The Pink House, it was listed on the National Register of Historic Places in 2004.

Deemed significant for its role in Genoa's history, it was built in approximately 1855 in carpenter Gothic style by carpenter Mark Gaige for John Reese, then later bought and moved (in 1870) by merchant J.R. Johnson, who painted it pink.  It was later owned by judge D.W. Virgin.  It has decorative bargeboards under its eaves and is topped by finials and other ornamentation.

The house's architecture — both original and later modifications — demonstrates historical trends in the community, depicting the growing prosperity both of its owners and of the community.

It is individually listed on the National Register in 2004, and also was included as a contributing building in the Genoa Historic District, NRHP-listed in 1975.

See also
List of the oldest buildings in Nevada

References 

Houses on the National Register of Historic Places in Nevada
Gothic Revival architecture in Nevada
Houses completed in 1855
National Register of Historic Places in Douglas County, Nevada
Houses in Douglas County, Nevada